Nexus is an Australian-based bi-monthly alternative news magazine. It covers geopolitics and conspiracy theories; health issues, including alternative medicine; future science; the unexplained, including UFOs; Big Brother; and historical revisionism. The magazine also publishes articles about freedom of speech and thought, and related issues. The magazine is or has been published in over 12 languages and is sold in over 20 countries. When including digital editions, Nexus has approximately 100,000 Australian readers and 1.1 million readers globally. It is owned and edited by Duncan Roads.

Statement of purpose
In the magazine's masthead, a statement of purpose is printed:

NEXUS recognises that humanity is undergoing a massive transformation. With this in mind, NEXUS seeks to provide 'hard-to-get' information so as to assist people through these changes. NEXUS is not linked to any religious, philosophical or political ideology or organisation.

History 
The magazine was first formed in 1986 by Ramses H. Ayana as a quarterly publication covering human rights, the environment, alternative health, women's rights, New Age, Free Energy, alternative science and the paranormal. Co-founder of the magazine was Jenni Elf and both founders had previously worked on the independent Australian magazine Maggie's Farm. Nexus was purchased by Duncan Roads in 1990, continuing a long tradition of keeping alternative publications alive in Australia. Following the handover, the topics covered by Nexus were changed and it moved to a bi-monthly publication schedule.

Criticism
The magazine promotes far-right conspiracy theories and propaganda that is especially in line with American militias and their worldviews.

Publication
The magazine's headquarters are located in Maleny, Queensland, Australia.  It is published in Australia, New Zealand, the US, the UK, France, Italy, Germany, Poland, Greece, Serbia, Croatia, Romania, and Russia. Nexus has also been translated in Swedish, Korean and Japanese.

In the US and in Italy, the magazine is published as Nexus New Times. In Greece, the magazine was first published as Nexus and, following a period of inactivity, as New Times Nexus. The Polish edition is published as Nexus. Nowe Czasy (.), A Swedish edition was published between 1998 and 2000 with the title NEXUS Nya Tider.

See also
List of magazines of anomalous phenomena
Philip Coppens, a contributor to Nexus magazine who died in 2012

References

External links

1986 establishments in Australia
Alternative magazines
Bi-monthly magazines published in Australia
Magazines established in 1986
Mass media in Queensland
News magazines published in Australia
Paranormal magazines
Quarterly magazines published in Australia
UFO-related literature
Western esoteric magazines